Quality and Qualifications Ireland (QQI) is the national agency responsible for qualifications in Ireland. It was established by the  Oireachtas in 2012 following the amalgamation of the National Qualifications Authority of Ireland, the Further Education and Training Awards Council, the Higher Education and Training Awards Council and the Irish Universities Quality Board.

The agency is under the aegis of the Minister for Further and Higher Education, Research, Innovation and Science. It is a member of the European Association of Quality Assurance Agencies for Higher Education. QQI is a registered agency in the European Quality Assurance Register for Higher Education. It is the National Academic Recognition Information Centre to support the implementation of the Lisbon Convention and the National Contact Point for the Europass European Qualifications Framework.

Dr Padraig Walsh is chief executive officer.

References

External links 
 

Education in the Republic of Ireland